Out of the Shadows is an action-adventure game developed for the ZX Spectrum by R.M. Waller and R.M.R. Woodward. It was published in 1984 by Mizar Computing and in 1986 on the compilation Fourmost Adventures by Global Software.

Reception
Out of the Shadows received a "Crash Smash" from CRASH magazine, who highlighted the novel light and shadow concept and overall complexity of the gameplay.

References

ZX Spectrum games
ZX Spectrum-only games
1984 video games
Action-adventure games
Video games developed in the United Kingdom